Óscar Serrano Rodríguez (born 30 September 1981) is a Spanish former footballer who played as a left winger.

He spent most of his professional career with Racing de Santander, appearing in 206 competitive matches over six and a half seasons and scoring 16 goals. In La Liga, he also played for Espanyol and Levante.

Club career
Born in Blanes, Girona, Catalonia, Serrano was still playing amateur football already in his 20s but, in July 2004, he went straight out of third division's UE Figueres to La Liga with neighbouring RCD Espanyol, for only €180.000, being an important attacking element in his only season (22 starts, 1.933 minutes of action) to help the latter finish fifth and qualify to the UEFA Cup.

For the 2005–06 campaign, Serrano moved to Racing de Santander, appearing in 34 matches with three goals in his third year as the Cantabrian club achieved a first ever UEFA Cup qualification. A skilled player with a volatile temperament, he was booked an average of ten times during his first four years, also being sent off in four games overall.

Serrano played in 33 matches in 2009–10, scoring three times as Racing again maintained its division status. On 25 April 2010, during a home loss against Villarreal CF, he sustained a serious anterior cruciate ligament injury which would sideline him until December; he celebrated his comeback by netting the only goal in a win at RCD Mallorca – in the 90th minute – having taken the pitch two minutes before, but relapsed shortly after, being limited to only four league appearances as his team again managed to stay afloat.

Upon recovering full fitness, Serrano never again regained his starter status. On 24 January 2012, he terminated his contract with Racing and joined fellow league side Levante UD, being sent off in his first game, a 0–3 home loss against Valencia CF in the quarter-finals of the Copa del Rey (1–7 on aggregate).

References

External links

1981 births
Living people
People from Selva
Sportspeople from the Province of Girona
Spanish footballers
Footballers from Catalonia
Association football wingers
La Liga players
Segunda División players
Segunda División B players
Tercera División players
UE Figueres footballers
RCD Espanyol footballers
Racing de Santander players
Levante UD footballers
Deportivo Alavés players
Catalonia international footballers